Piotr Siemionowski (born 6 June 1988 in Mrągowo) is a Polish sprint canoeist who has been competing since the late 2000s. He won a World Champion title in the K-1 200 m event at the 2011 ICF Canoe Sprint World Championships in Szeged, Hungary.

Siemionowski trains in the Zawisza Bydgoszcz.

References
Canoe09.ca profile

Polish male canoeists
Living people
1988 births
People from Mrągowo
Canoeists at the 2012 Summer Olympics
Olympic canoeists of Poland
ICF Canoe Sprint World Championships medalists in kayak